Sam van Huffel (born 24 June 1998) is a Dutch professional footballer who plays as a midfielder for Chojniczanka Chojnice in Poland.

Career

ADO Den Haag
Van Huffel started his youth career with ADO Den Haag. He became a regular for Jong ADO in the second half of the 2017–18 season, starting in central midfield.  He finished the season well scoring against RKC Waalwijk and Heracles Almelo.

He carried his good form into the start of the 2018–19 season, continuing to  start in midfield along side Johnny Reynolds. He scored against PEC Zwolle, forming good partnerships with Kyle Ebecilio and Chovanie Amatkarijo.

He made his final appearance for the club in a 4-2 defeat against Jong FC Twente on 29 April 2019.

Poland
After that, he played for Koninklijke HFC as a senior player. In 2020, he signed for Stomil Olsztyn in the Polish I liga.

On 28 June 2021, van Huffel moved to II liga club Chojniczanka Chojnice, signing a deal for the 2021-22 season.

References

External links 
 "I was directly in front of a guy you don't want to meet at night" 
 Sam van Huffel is delighted with transfer from Royal HFC to Stomil Olszytyn: 'Poles are not crazy, you know'
 1 Liga Hype: Unusual Sam van Huffel - has his own clothing brand and dreams of fighting UFC
 Sam van Huffel: Magical to play football here

Living people
1998 births
Dutch footballers
Dutch expatriate footballers
Footballers from Amsterdam
Association football midfielders
ADO Den Haag players
Koninklijke HFC players
OKS Stomil Olsztyn players
Chojniczanka Chojnice players
Tweede Divisie players
I liga players
II liga players
Expatriate footballers in Poland
Dutch expatriate sportspeople in Poland